Hunter River High School is a government-funded co-educational comprehensive secondary day school, located adjacent to the Hunter River, in , south of Raymond Terrace, in the Hunter Region of New South Wales, Australia.

Established as Raymond Terrace High School, the school enrolled approximately 800 students in 2018, from Year 7 to Year 12, of whom 19 percent identified as Indigenous Australians and four percent were from a language background other than English. The school is operated by the NSW Department of Education; the principal is Deb Dibley. 

The school's second motto, or slogan, is "Quality Relationships - Quality Learning".

See also 

 List of government schools in New South Wales
 Education in Australia
 Irrawang High School

References

External links 

 NSW Schools website

Public high schools in New South Wales
Port Stephens Council